Habitats & Heritage is a registered charity based at East Twickenham in the London Borough of Richmond upon Thames. It works in the London Boroughs of Richmond; Hounslow; Kingston; Wandsworth; Ealing; and Merton. It aims to understand the deep connection between urban nature and history by taking care of the local landscape; its wildlife, ecosystems and heritage.

The organisation was formed when the Environmental Trust for Richmond upon Thames merged with the South West London Environmental Network (SWLEN) in autumn 2020. It adopted its present name in November 2020.

Its chief executive is Colin Cooper.

Habitats & Heritage are guardians of several local buildings, including:

 Grove Gardens Chapel, Richmond Old Cemetery
 St Leonard's Court Air Raid Shelter, East Sheen
 Thames Eyot Boathouse, Twickenham
 The Burton Mausoleum, St Mary Magdalen's Church, Mortlake
 The Kilmorey Mausoleum, St Margarets

References

External links

2020 establishments in England
Charities based in London
Environmental organisations based in London
Environmental organizations established in 2020
Heritage organisations in England
Organisations based in the London Borough of Richmond upon Thames
Twickenham